Megachile bruchi is a species of bee in the family Megachilidae, making it a cousin of the alfalfa leafcutter bee (Megachile rotundata). It was described by Schrottky in 1909.

References

Bruchi
Insects described in 1909